Omi is a given name.

People with the  name include:

Given name
, Japanese voice actress
, former Japanese football player
, the pen-name of Komaki Ōmiya
Omi Vaidya (born 1982), American actor

Fictional characters
, a character from Saya no Uta

See also
Omi (singer), mononymous Jamaican singer

Japanese feminine given names